The 2022 Dublin Senior Hurling Championship was the 135th and current staging of the Dublin Senior Hurling Championship since its establishment by the Dublin County Board in 1887. The championship began on 19 July 2022 and ended on 23 October 2022.

Kilmacud Crokes entered the championship as the defending champions.

The final was played on 13 November 2022 at Parnell Park in Dublin, between Kilmacud Crokes and Na Fianna, it was the second year in a row they met in the final. Kilmacud Crokes won the match by 0-20 to 0-17, to win the championship two years in a row, their seventh championship title overall .

Senior 1

Group 1 

Round 1

Round 2

Round 3

Round 4

Round 5

Group 2 

Round 1

Round 2

Round 3

Round 4

Round 5

Quarter-finals

Semi-finals

Final

References

External links
Dublin GAA Fixtures & Results

2022 in Ireland
2020s in Dublin (city)